The 1970–71 Detroit Red Wings season was Gordie Howe's final season with the Red Wings. Ned Harkness was hired as coach in 1970 and was promoted to general manager midway through the season. His background was a successful college hockey coach. He tried to force his two-way style of play on a veteran Red Wings team resistant to change. Harkness also demanded short hair, no smoking, and put other rules in place regarding drinking and phone calls. The Red Wings finished in with a 22–45–11 record for 55 points for last place in the East Division, making things even worse was that they finished behind the two expansion clubs that season, the Buffalo Sabres and the Vancouver Canucks.

Offseason
The Fort Worth Wings of the Central Hockey League, coached by former Red Wings' defenceman Doug Barkley, continued to be operated as Detroit's top farm team during the 1969–70 season.

Regular season
Red Wings general manager Sid Abel wanted to get rid of coach Ned Harkness and was overruled by team owner Bruce Norris. Once Harkness took over as general manager, he got rid of players he deemed a threat to him. On January 10, 1971, Doug Barkley was promoted to become head coach of the Red wings, and on January 13, 1971, Frank Mahovlich was traded to the Montreal Canadiens for Mickey Redmond, Guy Charron and Bill Collins. Mahovlich was reunited with his brother Pete, who had become a star player himself with the Canadiens. One of the few highlights of the season was the emergence of young rookie goaltender Jim Rutherford.

 On October 29, Gordie Howe became the first player to record 1,000 assists in a 5–3 win over Boston at the Detroit Olympia.
The Wings suffered their worst defeat in franchise history January 2, when Toronto beat them 13–0.

Season standings

Schedule and results

Player statistics

Forwards
Note: GP = Games played; G = Goals; A = Assists; Pts = Points; PIM = Penalty minutes

Defencemen
Note: GP = Games played; G = Goals; A = Assists; Pts = Points; PIM = Penalty minutes

Goaltending
Note: GP = Games played; W = Wins; L = Losses; T = Ties; SO = Shutouts; GA = Goals against;  GAA = Goals against average

Awards and records

Draft picks
Detroit's draft picks at the 1970 NHL Amateur Draft held at the Queen Elizabeth Hotel in Montreal, Quebec.

References
Red Wings on Hockey Database

Detroit
Detroit
Detroit Red Wings seasons
Detroit Red Wings
Detroit Red Wings